Luc Brewaeys (25 October 1959 in Mortsel, Belgium – 18 December 2015 in Antwerp, Belgium) was a Belgian composer, conductor, pianist and recording producer at the VRT (Flemish Radio & Television). He studied composition with André Laporte in Brussels, with Franco Donatoni in Siena (Italy) and with Brian Ferneyhough in Darmstadt (Germany).

Prizes and distinctions
 3rd prize of the European Competition for Young Composers (1985).
 1st prize in the category "young composers" from the international tribunal of composers of UNESCO (1986).
 1st prize "Prix de Musique Contemporaine du Québec" (1988) for the work entière.
 1st prize for the competition of European composers at the International meeting of contemporary music in Metz (1988).
 The prize for the "Musique de la Communauté Flamande" (1989)
 The SABAM prize (1990)
 1st prize for "Premio Musicale Città di Trieste" for symphonic composition (1991).

Works and Discography

Vocal and Choral works
2015              On a day  9'
2010              speechless song, seeming many, being one ‘Sonnet n° 8’ by William Shakespeare  ca. 6'
2009              vogliamo inneggiare all’uomo 3'
2007              Fantasia con tre canzoni popolare Napoletane     8'
2006              L'uomo dal fiore in bocca   Opera in one Act  ca 45'
2003              Jocasta     22'
2003              I' vidi / La vita fugge     8'30"
2002              Come here, Ulysses     4'30"
2000              Credeva...   in memoriam Franco DONATONI  14'
1999              Schumann's Ghosts     2'35"
1991              Antigone   Lyric Tragedy  ca. 70'
1990              Non lasciate ogni speranza     33'20"
1989              Réquialm     21'

Orchestral works
2015              …sciolto nel foro universale del vuoto…  ca. 17'
2008              Shadows with Melodies      15'
2007              Symphony n° 7   (2001–02, rev. 2007)  17'
2006              L'uomo dal fiore in bocca   Opera in one Act  ca. 45'
2005              Préludes Book II by Claude Debussy   recomposed for orchestra  40'
2005              Along the Shores of Lorn     12'
2004              Préludes Book I by Claude Debussy   recomposed for orchestra  40'
2004              Symphony n° 8     12' -in pr
2002              5 Préludes from Book I by Claude Debussy   recomposed for orchestra  16'
2000              Credeva...   in memoriam Franco DONATONI  14'
2000              Symphony n° 6     21'30"
1997              Fasten Seat Belts !   Nightmare for Orchestra  4'
1996              Introduction     4'40"
1993              Laphroaig - Symphony n° 5     27'
1993              Talisker     30'
1992              Only Very Unusual Matters     3'30"
1992              Kientzyphonie (Symphony n° 4)   Symphony n° 4  22'
1991              Dalì's Dream?     9'
1991              Symphony n° 3 : Hommage     10'30"
1990              Non lasciate ogni speranza     33'20"
1988              Cheers !     2'30"
1987              Komm ! Hebe dich... (Symphony n° 2)   Symphony n° 2  15'
1985              .., e poi c'era... (Symphony n° 1)   Symphony n° 1  15'

Chamber music (more than 5 musicians)
2015              On a day  9'
2014              Eppur si muove  ca. 11'30"
2012              Fêtes à tensions : (les) eaux marchent  ca. 15'
2009              Double Concerto  ca. 15'
2008              Cardhu      ca. 15'
2008              Painted Pyramids     16'
2008              Nobody is Perfect ! (Frank Nuyts Fifty)     1'45"
2007              Fantasia con tre canzoni popolare Napoletane     8'
2006              Mozart's Ghosts     8'
2005              Hermesfanfare     2'30"
2004              Stolen Silence     4'33"
2003              Jocasta     22'
2001              Benché nessuno.., sorride     13'30"
1999              Schumann's Ghosts     2'35"
1999              Beyond the Deadline     2'15"
1997              Works by Frank ZAPPA     15'
1996              OBAN     10'
1996              Nobody is Perfect ! (André Laporte sixty-five)     1'45"
1992              Le Concert   Music for a film by Samy BRUNETT.  6'
1989              Réquialm     21'
1986              Due cose belle ha il mondo: l'amore e la morte...     12'
1982              Trajet     9'

Chamber music (5 or less musicians)
2008              3 Miniatures      1'
2007              Nobody is Perfect ! (Jonathan Harvey Sixty)   (1999, rev. 2007)  2'30"
2004              Utopia     9'
2003              Haydn ?     5'30"
2000              Violacello     1'
1999              Nobody is Perfect ! (João Pedro Oliveira forty)     3'30"
1998              Nobody is Perfect ! (Lukas Foss seventy-five)     4'00"
1997              Les Méandres de la Mémoire     12-13'
1996              Last Minute Piece     1'30"
1995              Bowmore   String Quartet nr. 2  17'30"
1993              Unicorn Telex     4'30"
1992              Jocaste's (grand-) daughter     15'30"
1991              Antigone   Lyric Tragedy  ca. 70'
1991              Knockando     8'
1989              Namk'Cotts
1989              The Zappa Album   works by Frank Zappa  42'
1989              String Quartet n° 1     15'
1988              Aouellaouellaouelle!     10'
1988              Works by George GERSHWIN     12'
1983              Het Raadsel van de Sfinks (The Riddle of the Sphinx)   Music for a film by Jef CORNELIS.  55'
1981              Conuflinicty - 1 + 1 = 3     13'30"

Solo works
2013              Ni fleurs ni couronnes : Monument pour Jonathan Harvey  ca. 13'
2011              Per André L. 80  ca. 3
2010              speechless song, seeming many, being one ‘Sonnet n° 8’ by William Shakespeare ca. 6'
2009              Fred’s Hallucination  1'
2009              Black Rock Unfolding 16'
2001              Si sentiva un po' stanco...      6'30"
1999              Metastudy     1'
1997              Per Roberto F.     6'30"
1997              In between...     1'30"
1996              Il fiume del tempo passava...     7'30"
1996              Nobody is Perfect ! (Michael Finnissy Fifty)     2'30"
1995              "... far !.."     2'30"
1994              Attention : Alto Solo !     7'25"
1994              Le Chant de la Sirène     5'15"
1991              Dirge for Dina     3'30"
1991              Jacquerie - Jacques qui rit     5'30"
1990              Very Saxy     4'30"
1989              Pyramids in Siberia     16'
1989              Again     12'
1988              Immer weiter, oder..?     5'
1982              Parametric Permutations     5'
1977              Epitaphium     4'

Electronic music
2013              Ni fleurs ni couronnes : Monument pour Jonathan Harvey  ca. 13'
2009              Double Concerto  ca. 15'
2009              Black Rock Unfolding 16'
2008              Painted Pyramids      16'
2003              Jocasta     22'
2000              Symphony n° 6     21'30"
1993              Laphroaig - Symphony n° 5     27'
1992              Jocaste's (grand-) daughter     15'30"
1991              Antigone   Lyric Tragedy  ca. 70'
1989              Metallofonie     30'
1986              Due cose belle ha il mondo: l'amore e la morte...     12'
1982              Trajet     9'

Bibliography

References

External links
Homepage
 Koninklijk Conservatorium Brussel now houses most works and manuscripts of Brewaeys, after the bankruptcy of CeBeDeM in 2015.

1959 births
2015 deaths
Belgian pianists
Belgian composers
Male composers
Belgian male musicians
International Rostrum of Composers prize-winners
People from Mortsel